Ovintiv Inc. is a hydrocarbon exploration and production company organized in Delaware and headquartered in Denver, United States. It was founded and headquartered in Calgary, Alberta, under its previous name Encana. It was the largest energy company and largest natural gas producer in Canada, before moving to the United States in 2020. The company was rebranded as Ovintiv and relocated to Denver in 201920.

Hydrocarbon production
Of 2021 production, 56% was in the United States and 44% was in Canada.

History

1880s to 2002 - Canadian Pacific and PanCanadian years 
When the Canadian Pacific Railway was formed, the government of Sir John A. Macdonald compensated it for assuming the risk of developing the railroad with the subsurface rights for a checkerboard pattern of most of Alberta and part of Saskatchewan. These rights were later spun off to the company's predecessors.

While drilling for water near Medicine Hat, in 1883 Canadian Pacific Railway staff discovered natural gas.

On July 3, 1958, Canadian Pacific created "Canadian Pacific Oil and Gas" to manage its oil and gas properties and its mineral rights which, in 1971 merged with "Central-Del Rio Oils", to create PanCanadian Petroleum Limited.

2002 to 2019 - the Encana years 
In April 2002, Pan Canadian Petroleum Ltd was spun out of Canadian Pacific Limited. It subsequently merged with Alberta Energy Corporation to form EnCana. Gwyn Morgan was named president and CEO.

In 2009, EnCana completed the corporate spin-off of Cenovus Energy, which held its oil business, representing one-third of its total production and reserves, and EnCana Corporation retaining the natural gas business. Investors favoured the split as it gave them the flexibility to choose between investing in oil, gas, or both.

In December 2012, Encana announced a US$2.1 billion joint venture with state-owned, Beijing-based PetroChina through which PetroChina received a 49.9% stake in Encana's Duvernay Formation acreage in Alberta. This was in line with the rules that "favor minority stakes over takeovers" since Prime Minister Stephen Harper's December 7, 2012 prohibition of purchases by state-owned enterprises seeking to invest in Canadian oil. By the end of 2012, Encana's staff had increased to 4,169 employees.

Encana and Cenovus' headquarters, The Bow in Calgary, was completed in 2013, becoming the tallest building in Canada outside of Toronto. The project, owned by H&R REIT, was announced as Encana's headquarters in 2006, prior to the Cenovus split.

In November 2013, the company cut its dividend, announced layoffs of 20% of its employees, closure of its office in Plano, Texas, and plans to sell assets and to found a separate company for its mineral rights and royalty interests across southern Alberta. It planned to invest 75% of its 2014 capital budget into 5 projects: Projects in the Montney Formation and the Duvernay Formation in Alberta, the San Juan Basin in New Mexico, Louisiana's Tuscaloosa Marine Shale, and the Denver-Julesburg Basin (DJ Basin) in northeast Colorado, Wyoming, and Nebraska.

In October 2019, the company announced plans to move its operations from Canada to Denver, where its CEO lived, and change its name to Ovintiv.

The name change, notably the dropping of "Cana" was met with criticism in Canada. Encana's departure from Canada "only intensified the gloom enveloping the Canadian energy industry after foreign companies sold more than US$30 billion". Youssef Youssef, a commerce professor at Humber College in Toronto, also takes this perspective, citing the difficulty in changing a brand as recognizable as this one "(Encana) was a solid brand and it had resonance within the Canadian oil industry, and everybody knows the company, so to change the brand, it takes a lot of steps.”

2020 to present day - Ovintiv 
On January 24, 2020, after receiving shareholder approval, the company completed the transfer of its corporate domicile from Canada to the United States, Ovintiv Canada ULC retains an office in Calgary.

In June 2020, the company announced layoffs of 25% of its workforce.

List of notable sales, mergers and acquisitions 
In October 2004, EnCana sold its UK unit, including a 43% stake in the Buzzard field (discovered in 2001 by a PanCanadian-led group), to Nexen for $2.1bn US.

In January 2007, the company sold its assets in Chad to China National Petroleum Corporation for $202.5 million.

In May 2007, the company sold its assets in the delta of the Mackenzie River.

In 2009, EnCana's oil business was spun-off as Cenovus Energy.

In November 2011, a potential buyer backed out of a $45 million deal to buy the company's gas field in Pavillion, Wyoming.

In December 2011, the company sold the majority of its natural gas producing assets in the Barnett Shale.

In February 2012, Mitsubishi paid approximately C$2.9 billion for a 40% interest in the Cutbank Ridge Partnership with Encana, which involves 409,000 net acres of Montney Formation natural gas lands in northeast British Columbia. The company also sold its midstream assets in the Cutbank Ridge to Veresen for C$920 million.

In June 2014, the company sold its Bighorn assets in Alberta to Jupiter Resources for US$1.8 billion.

In November 2014, the company acquired Athlon Energy for $7.1 billion.

In May 2014, Jonah Energy LLC acquired the company's Jonah Field operations in Sublette County, Wyoming.

In June 2014, the company acquired assets in the Eagle Ford Group from Freeport-McMoRan for $3.1 billion.

In August 2015, the company sold its assets in the Haynesville Shale for $850 million to affiliates of GSO Capital Partners and GeoSouthern Energy.

In December 2015, the company significantly cut its dividend and capital expenditures budget after a fall in energy prices.

In July 2016, the company sold its assets in the Denver Basin for $900 million.

In June 2017, the company sold its assets in the Piceance Basin for $735 million.

In May 2018, the company permanently ceased production at Deep Panuke. The Deep Panuke project produced and processed natural gas 250 kilometers offshore southeast of Halifax, Nova Scotia. The platform was sent for recycling in 2020.

In December 2018, the company sold its assets in the San Juan Basin for $480 million.

In February 2019, the company acquired Newfield Exploration.

Major land assets
The company has a land position in Canada of 1.3 million net acres, of which about 773,000 net acres are undeveloped. Its assets in Canada are in the Montney Formation, where it has a partnership with Mitsubishi to develop Cutbank Ridge, Wheatland County, Alberta, and the Horn River Formation.

In February 2022, Ovintiv absorbed former subsidiary EWL Management Limited making it the owner of five decommissioned mines in Ontario: Coldstream Copper Mine, Gordon Lake Mine, Greyhawk Mine (uranium), Dyno Mine (uranium), and Madawaska Mine (uranium) which is being rehabilitated to meet current compliant standards.

In the United States, the company holds approximately 929,000 net acres of land, of which 152,000 net acres are undeveloped. It operates in the Permian Basin, Anadarko Basin, Uinta Basin, and the Bakken formation.

Lawsuits

Alleged collusion and bid rigging with Chesapeake Energy
From 2008 through 2010, the company accumulated 250,000 net acres in the Collingwood-Utica Shale gas play in the Middle Ordovician Collingwood formation of the Michigan Basin at an average cost of $150/acre. In May 2012, the company paid about $185 an acre for oil and gas rights on 2,156 acres (873 hectares) at an auction by the Michigan Department of Natural Resources, which was "88 percent less than the average paid two years ago in the area".

In July 2012, Reuters reported about e-mails between the company and Chesapeake Energy, the second-largest natural gas producer in the U.S., to divide up Michigan counties state land leases to suppress land prices in an October 2010 auction. In 2013, a private landowner filed suit against the company and Chesapeake for bid rigging. Justice Department and Michigan authorities were investigating whether state or federal laws were violated; the Internal Revenue Service and U.S. Securities and Exchange Commission also investigated.

While the case was dropped by the DOJ, Michigan's Attorney General followed up on the accusations, and Encana ended up with a fine of $5 million, and Chesapeake paid $25 million into a victim-compensation fund.

Failed lawsuit by adjacent property owners to prevent drilling
In 2013, two property owners adjacent to a drilling unit filed suit against the Michigan Department of Environmental Quality (DEQ) and Encana for potential harm due to proximity. In October 2013, the judge of the Circuit Court of Ingham County issued an injunction against Encana starting to drill until an administrative hearing before DEQ's supervisor of wells had been completed, re part 12 of DEQ's rules for oil and gas operations. In May 2014, the supervisor of wells found with Encana, that the petitioners did "not have standing", because they did not own land within the drilling unit and dismissed the case.

Alleged excessive water use for hydraulic fracturing
In November 2013, Ecojustice, the Sierra Club and the Wilderness Committee filed a lawsuit against Encana Corporation and the British Columbia's Oil and Gas Commission for excessive water use from lakes and rivers for its hydraulic fracturing for shale gas, "granted by repeated short-term water permits, a violation of the provincial water act".

Criticism

Wyoming water pollution 
In spring 2008, residents from Pavillion, Wyoming, approached the United States Environmental Protection Agency (EPA) about changes in water quality from their domestic wells. Encana was the primary natural gas producer in the area. In 2009, the EPA announced that it had found hydrocarbon contaminants in residents' drinking water wells.

Pipeline explosions
In Pouce Coupe British Columbia five explosions targeted Encana pipelines between October 2008 and January 2009; media reports indicate the pipeline may have been bombed by a disgruntled community member fearing the sour gas (containing hydrogen sulfide, which can be fatal if too much of it is inhaled) poses a danger to the community. Encana was fined CAD $250,000 under Canada's Environmental Emergency Act.

Encana's hydraulic fracturing operations in the United States are portrayed in the 2010 documentary, Gasland, which alleges that hydraulic fracturing causes pollution of ground and surface water, air, and soil.

Deep Panuke project
Issues were raised for the Deep Panuke project offshore of Nova Scotia, when it was proposed in 2006 as a smaller version with increased ocean discharges and when Encana asked for a "streamlined regulatory process" without public hearings.

Track record of legal charges 
In British Columbia, between 2007 and 2019, Ovintiv was charged for breaching provincial legislation 19 times, more than any other company, as well as being fined the highest amount.

Leadership

Chairman of the Board 
David P. O'Brien, 2002–2013
Clayton H. Woitas, 2013–2020
Peter A. Dea, 2020–

President 
Gwyn Morgan, 2002–2005
Randall K. Eresman, 2005–2013
Clayton H. Woitas (interim), 2013
Douglas J. Suttles, 2013–2019
Michael G. McAllister, 2019–2020
Brendan M. McCracken, 2020–

References

External links

Companies listed on the New York Stock Exchange
Oil companies of the United States
Natural gas companies of the United States
Companies based in Denver
Non-renewable resource companies established in 2002
Non-renewable resource companies established in 2020
Energy companies established in 2002
Energy companies established in 2020
American companies established in 2020
2002 establishments in Alberta
Canadian companies established in 2002
Canadian companies disestablished in 2020
2020 establishments in Colorado
2020 disestablishments in Alberta
Oil companies
Energy companies